Roshana Taquise Palmer (born March 8, 1989) is a Canadian Positive/Inspirational R&B singer-songwriter managed by S4 Entertainment.

Biography
Roshana began in her shy pre-teen years, as part of a local youth choir. Headlining at many local events, Roshana has successfully started her musical career. When speaking to her ultimate motivation, she writes. "So many days I sat and prayed to see this dream come true, it's coming to pass and it's coming so fast and it's all because I listened to You.”

Influenced and inspired by the works of Lauryn Hill, Fred Hammond, Boyz II Men, Tamia, Beyoncé, and Alicia Keys; it is Roshana's heartfelt riffs and soul searching approach that makes her style unmistakably her own.  With her distinguished trademark sound, Roshana is diligently recording songs for her second album.  After the tremendous success of her debut, award-winning solo album, (produced mostly by Chozen Williams and also included the hit single "Steady", produced by Dan "DFS" Johnson, the demand for this hot new young talent to bring forth new material is quickly rising. Roshana continues to flourish to new heights as she continues to set her life to music.

Roshana was the noted Opening Act for Brian Littrell of the Backstreet Boys, Cross Movement and Israel Houghton while on their Toronto tour dates.

Roshana is currently working on her new album which is said to feature Canadian Idol Finalist Gary Beals.

Discography

Awards and nominations
GMA Canada Covenant Awards
 2005 nominee, Best Contemporary Gospel/Urban Album of the Year: Roshana
 2005 nominee, Best Urban Song Of The Year: "Steady"

Maja Awards
 2006 nominee, Best Young Performer
 2006 nominee, Best New Artist
 2006 Best Urban Gospel Performer

Shai Awards
 2007 nominee, Best Urban Gospel Album: Roshana

References

External links 
 Roshana's MySpace. Retrieved April 18, 2009.
 S4 Entertainment (label). Retrieved April 18, 2009.

Canadian contemporary R&B singers
Canadian performers of Christian music
Musicians from Toronto
Living people
1989 births
21st-century Canadian women singers